"It's in the Way That You Use It" is a song which was written by the English rock musician Eric Clapton in collaboration with The Band's guitarist and composer Robbie Robertson. The song was recorded and performed by Eric Clapton, who released the track under licence of Warner Bros. Records as the second of four singles from his 1986 studio album August in March 1987. The song, which is used as the theme tune to the Martin Scorsese film The Color of Money, was produced by Eric Clapton himself with the help of Tom Dowd, who acted as the assistant producer. The release sold more than 500,000 copies worldwide.

Composition
The song was specially written as part of the film soundtrack for the movie The Color of Money, which was directed by Martin Scorsese and starred Paul Newman and Tom Cruise as pool sharks. The recording first appeared as part of the film soundtrack, before it was released as a single or on Eric Clapton's 1986 studio album release. The British rock musician wrote "It's in the Way That You Use It" with Robbie Robertson, whose work with The Band in the 1960s encouraged Eric Clapton to get away from the long, heavy solos he was playing with Cream. Robertson was in charge of the music for The Color of Money, but because he was not finished with his first solo album, his record company would not let him sing on any of the songs. He got around it by contributing instrumental songs to the soundtrack. The original song title was "The Gift".

Release
"It's in the Way That You Use It" was released as an official single in late 1986 for the following territories: Australia, Canada, the United States and Portugal. For the rest of the world, mainly including Europe, especially Germany and the United Kingdom, the single was released in March 1987. The single was released on both 7" and 12" formats. The single was also released in Japan. The track features Eric Clapton playing electric guitar and singing lead vocals with a band consisting of Gary Brooker as a background vocalist, Henry Spinetti on drums, Richard Cottle playing the synthesizer and Laurence Cottle playing bass guitar.

Reception
Cash Box said that it "contains a blistering volley of lead guitar genius."  Billboard called it a "neatly executed rocker [that] strongly recalls his mid-'70s."

Chart performance
The single release did not chart on the Billboard Hot 100 singles chart, although it sold a total of 183,291 copies in the United States. However, "It's in the Way That You Use It" reached position two on the Mainstream Rock Tracks chart in 1986 and eventually positioned itself at the top of the charts one year after. In total, the song spent fifteen weeks on the chart, which is compiled by the Billboard magazine. In Canada, the song did not enter the national single charts either, selling 1,493 copies in total. In the United Kingdom, the single released peaked at number 77 on the official charts, selling a total of 34,294 copies over all. The song stayed four weeks on the chart, compiled by the Official Charts Company in Britain. In Australia, the single charted at its highest position, ranking at position 24. In total, the single sold more than 500,000 copies worldwide.

Music video
A music video featuring Eric Clapton performing the song in front of blue lights, alongside clips from The Color of Money was released to accompany the single release.

In popular culture

The song is featured in The Color Of Money directed by Martin Scorsese.

The song was briefly featured in season 6 episode 2 ("Lawnmower Maintenance and Postnatal Care") of Community. The song was also featured in the season 4 episode of Rick and Morty "The Vat of Acid Episode." Both shows were created by Dan Harmon.

It was also featured in season 3 episode 1 ("Chapter 14") of Eastbound and Down.

Personnel 

 Eric Clapton – guitar, lead vocals
 Gary Brooker – keyboards, backing vocals
 Richard Cottle – synthesizer 
 Laurence Cottle – bass guitar
 Henry Spinetti – drums

Chart positions

Weekly charts

References

1986 songs
1986 singles
Eric Clapton songs
Songs written by Eric Clapton
Songs written by Robbie Robertson
Warner Records singles
Songs written for films